The Sanchong Yi Tian Temple is a traditional Taoist temple  located in Sanchong District, New Taipei, Taiwan. Built in 1965, the sea goddess Mazu is the principal Deity worshiped at Sanchong Yi Tian Temple. The temple is the center of religious worship in the surrounding areas of Sanchong and Luzhou. It is also known locally as Cat Temple as it is famous for providing a shelter for neighborhood stray cats. It is believed that these lanterns initially attracted the felines to the temple.

Transportation
The temple is accessible by Sanchong metro station of Taipei Metro.

Gallery

See also
 Mazu
 Gangkou Temple (笨港口港口宮) in Chiayi, Taiwan
 List of temples in Taiwan
 Religion in Taiwan

References

External links

1965 establishments in Taiwan
Religious buildings and structures completed in 1965
Taoist temples in Taiwan
Mazu temples in New Taipei